The 2019 Ykkönen was the 48th season of Ykkönen, the second highest football league in Finland. The season started on 27 April 2019. The winning team was qualified promoted to the 2020 Veikkausliiga, while the second-placed team played a play-off against the eleventh-placed team from Veikkausliiga to decide who would play in that division. The bottom team was relegated to Kakkonen.

Overview

A total of ten teams contested in the league, including six sides from the 2018 season, TPS was relegated from Veikkausliiga and MYPA, MuSa and TPV who were promoted from Kakkonen after winning the promotion play-offs.

League table

Promotion/relegation play-offs

TPS won 3-0 on aggregate and are promoted

Season statistics

Top scorers

References

Ykkönen seasons
Fin
Fin
2019 in Finnish football leagues